Fokovci is a village north of Moravske Toplice in the Prekmurje region of Slovenia.

There is a small chapel with a three-storey belfry next to the graveyard in the settlement. There is also a Pentecostal church in the settlement.

References

External links

Fokovci on Geopedia

Populated places in the Municipality of Moravske Toplice